The Women's Premier Soccer League (WPSL) is an amateur women's soccer league in the United States and Canada. It is the top amateur league for women's soccer in the United States soccer pyramid, below only National Women's Soccer League (NWSL). The WPSL is the longest-running active women's soccer league as it enters its 23rd season in 2021 – the 2020 season was cancelled due to the COVID-19 pandemic. The WPSL is also the largest women's soccer league in the United States, North America  and the world with 135 active teams. 

The WPSL started as the Western Division of the W-League, before breaking away to form its own league in 1998. The league is sanctioned by the United States Adult Soccer Association, an affiliate of the United States Soccer Federation (USSF). WPSL players consists of collegiate and post-collegiate players, who currently or have played across all divisions of the NCAA, NAIA, and NJCAA. Former players of the WPSL have taken their playing careers to the next level by signing professional in the NWSL and top leagues overseas. WPSL Alumnae have also reached international status by making international rosters seen in the FIFA Women's World Cup and the Olympics. Notable alumnae include Brandi Chastain, Kristine Lilly, Heather Mitts, Julie Foudy, Shannon Boxx, and Leslie Osborne.

When Women's Professional Soccer (WPS) suspended play in 2012, WPSL moved forward with its ambitions toward professionalism and created the WPSL Elite League.  The Elite League was a pro-am league, with at least four fully professional teams, including three former WPS teams.  The Elite league operated for just the 2012 season, disbanding in 2013 with the formation of the NWSL, which the three former WPS teams joined.

In 2021, the WPSL announced its second division, WPSL U21, which is scheduled to begin play in mid-2021.

On February 8, 2023, WPSL announced plans to create a Division III professional league named WPSL PRO. The league plans to start in 2025 with ten teams.

WPSL champions

Staff

Executive committee
 Sean Jones – president
 DeBray Ayala – vice-president
 Brad Lund – vice-president
 Kendra Halterman – commissioner
 Matt Homonoff – deputy commissioner
 Rich Sparling – commissioner emeritus

Front office
 Alex Simpson - team services manager (West & East)
 Jaclyn Purvine - team services manager (Central & South)
 Bekah LaCaze – team services manager (WPSL U21)
 Nichole Singleton – communications & creative services director
 Jeramie McPeek – social media director
 Dr. Vytas Ringus – medical director
 David Simmons – referee coordinator
 Josh Fredrickson – match reporting
 Rob Kehoe – collegiate relations

Associate commissioners
 Shelley Dougherty – east region
 Sam Hope – south region
 Lindsay Eversmeyer – central region
 Sly Yeates – west region

League Structure
The league is divided into four regions - West, Central, South, and East. Each region is divided into conferences, with the West Region having five conferences, the Central Region having six conferences, the South Region having five conferences, and the East Region having five conferences. Each conference has 5 to 10 teams.

Current teams

Former teams 

ACF Torino USA Maryland (2014–2015)
ASA Charge FC Maryland
Ajax America Women California
Albuquerque Crush New Mexico (2002)
Albuquerque Lady Asylum New Mexico (2007–2008)
American Eagles Soccer Club Texas
Arizona Sahuaros Arizona (2003)
Arkansas Comets Arkansas
Atlanta Silverbacks Women Georgia
Auto Trader Select SC California (1998–1999)
Bay Area Breeze California (2011–2012) – Left to join W-League
Boston Aztec Massachusetts
Brevard County Cocoa Expos Florida (2008)
Chattanooga FC Women Tennessee (2014-2018, on hiatus for 2019, returning in 2020)
CFC Passion Connecticut
CU Diamonds Washington
Central California Gold California (2004)
Central California HEAT California
Cincinnati Lady Saints Ohio (2014–15)
Clermont Phoenix Florida
Club Tijuana USA Baja California
Colorado Springs United Colorado (2007–2008, Colorado Springs Sabers 2006)
Elk Grove Pride California (2002–2005)
Emerald City FC Washington
Empire Revs WNY New York (2013–2015)
Everton FC America Texas (2005)
Eugene Timbers FC Azul Oregon
FC Austin Texas
FC Metro Magic Missouri (2009–2010, FC St. Louis 2006–2008)
FC Milwaukee Nationals Wisconsin
FC Sacramento Thunder  California (1998–1999)
FC St. George Utah
FC Ulindi Pennsylvania
FC Virginia Virginia (2006)
FC Westchester New York
Foothill FC California (2000)
Fort Lauderdale Fusion Florida (2006)
Fort Wayne FC Indiana
Fresno FC Ladies California (2018)
Georgia Revolution Georgia
Houston Aces Texas – moved to United Women's Soccer
Houston Stars Texas (2003–2005)
Houston Tornadoes Texas (2003)
Indiana United Indiana
L.A. Salsa California
Lancaster Inferno (WPSL) Pennsylvania – moved to United Women's Soccer
Las Vegas Shooters Nevada (1998–1999, 2001)
Las Vegas Tabagators Nevada (2004–2006)
FC Lehigh Valley Lady Sonic Pennsylvania – Left to join W-League
Lions Swarm Maryland
Liverpool Lady Warriors Texas
Madison 56ers Wisconsin
Maryland Capitols FC Maryland
Maryland Pride Maryland (2004–2007, 2009–2010)
Massachusetts Stingers Massachusetts (2004–2007)
Memphis Mercury Tennessee (2006)
Michigan Chill SC Michigan (2016)
Michigan Lions Michigan 
Michigan Phoenix Michigan (2006)
Mississippi Fuego FC Mississippi
Mississippi Fuego FC U23 Mississippi (2012)
New England Mutiny Massachusetts – moved to United Women's Soccer
New England Mutiny Reserves Massachusetts
New Jersey Blaze New Jersey
New York Vendaval New York (2003)
Norcal Shockwaves California (1998–1999)
North Shore Girls Soccer Club British Columbia (2016–2017)
Northampton Laurels Pennsylvania (2006–2008)
Northern California Blues California (2003–2004)
Oregon Rush Oregon
Orlando Falcons Florida (2006–2007)
Ohio Galaxies Ohio
Ohio Premier Women's SC Ohio
Orange County Waves California (2011)
PAO ST. Louis Missouri (2011) no games played
Palm City FC Florida
Philadelphia Fever Pennsylvania
Phoenix U23 Arizona (2012)
Pines 1779 Texas
Portland Rain Oregon
Quad City Eagles Illinois
Real Del Mar California (1998)
Real Salt Lake Women Utah – moved to United Women's Soccer
Real Shore FC New Jersey (2007)
Reno Zephyrs Nevada (1999)
Rhode Island Rays Rhode Island (2003–2006)
River Cities FC Missouri (2006–2007)
Rochester Reign New York (2004)
San Francisco Skyhawks California (1998–1999)
San Joaquin Valley Quest California (2003)
St. George United Utah
St. Louis Archers Missouri (2005)
St. Louis Scott Gallagher Elite Missouri (2009–2010)
Silicon Valley Red Devils California (1998–2000)
Spokane Shine Washington
Sonoma County Sol California (2006–2008)
Sonoran Thunder Arizona (2002–2003)
South Florida Strikers Florida
Steel City Sparks Pennsylvania (2004–05)
Tampa Bay Elite Florida (2006–2007)
Tennessee Lady Blues Tennessee (2006)
Texas Football Club Texas
Tidewater Sharks Virginia
Tkaronto Justice New York (2015)
Tri-City Celtics New York
United FC Binghamton New York
Utah Starzz Utah
Vancouver Island FC British Columbia (2019)
Vancouver Angels British Columbia (2000)
TSS FC Rovers British Columbia (2018-2020)
West Texas Pride FC Texas
Windsor Essex FC Ontario (2015)

See also

 NWSL
 WPSL Elite League

References

External links
WPSL official site

 
2
United States Adult Soccer Association leagues
Professional soccer leagues in the United States
Sports leagues established in 1997
1997 establishments in the United States
Women's soccer in Canada
Women's football in Mexico
Multi-national professional sports leagues